East Hills Rugby League Football Club is an Australian rugby league football club based in East Hills, New South Wales. They conduct teams for both junior, senior and women tag teams.

See also

References

External links
 

Rugby league teams in Sydney
Rugby clubs established in 1965
1965 establishments in Australia